Di Bella is an Italian surname.
It may refer to:

 Luigi di Bella, an Italian medical doctor and physiology professor, author of a purported therapy for cancer 

 Carmelo Di Bella, Italian football player and manager
 Edoardo Di Bella (born 2001), Italian football defender
 Fabrizio Di Bella (born 1988), Italian football defender
 Paul Di Bella (born 1977), Australian sprinter
 Rosario Di Bella (born 1963), an Italian composer and singer-songwriter
 Vincenzo Di Bella, an Italian rally driver
 DiBella Winery, a winery in Gloucester County, New Jersey

Italian-language surnames